Southville International School and Colleges (SISC) is a private, non-sectarian school.

Historical background
Southville International School and Colleges was founded in 1990 as Southville International School. The school started by offering preschool at its Elizalde Campus, and eventually expanded to offer primary school, secondary school, International Baccalaureate Diploma Programme, and college degree courses.

The school has several campuses, the Elizalde Campus which offers Nursery to Preparatory, the Munich Campus which houses Nursery to Grade Five students, Luxembourg Campus which houses Grade Six to Grade Twelve students and the college students, and the Tropical Campus which houses the Scholastic Reading Center and the International Baccalaureate, The Capital Market and Entrepreneurship Center, the Taylor Training Center and other function rooms.

Academics
SISC offers early childhood education, primary school (via its Grade School Division), secondary school (via its High School Division), and college education.

College Degree Programs
The SISC College Division offers majors such as:
 BS Nursing
 BS Tourism
BS Business Administration major in
Financial Management
Human Resource Management
Marketing Management
Two-Degree Program
BS Psychology and BSBA Human Resource Management
BSBA Marketing Management and BS Entrepreneurship
 BS Entrepreneurship
With Special Track in Fashion Design
BS Information Technology
 BS Psychology
 BS Accountancy
 AB Mass Communication
 AB Media Arts
 BS Elementary Education with focus in Special Education

Graduate Degree Programs
The College Division offers the following degree programs:

 Master of Arts in Psychology
Master in Business Administration
Master in Information Technology

International Learning Center
The school operates an International Learning Center, or ILC, for non-English speaking students until they are ready to join the school's main English classes.
The school is also teaching students many different languages like British, Australian, English, South American and North American if they are willing to learn them

Asian SEED Academy of Technology
Southville International School and Colleges also operates the Asian SEED Academy of Technology, which was established in 1999 to teach post-secondary, non-formal technology, vocational, office management, and entrepreneurship. The academy has courses in information systems to students who wish to pursue computer and office management careers.

Affiliations
The school is affiliated with the following:
 Philippine Stock Exchange (The online stock trading held at the SISC Capital Market and Entrepreneurship Center is supported by the PSE.)
 Scholastic Inc., Philippines (The Scholastic English Learning Program is held at SISC premises.)
 Las Piñas Doctors' Hospital (One of the affiliate hospitals where SISC BS Nursing students do their internship.)

Cousin Schools
Southville International School affiliated with Foreign Universities

References

External links
 

International schools in Metro Manila
International Baccalaureate schools in the Philippines
Universities and colleges in Metro Manila
Education in Las Piñas
Educational institutions established in 1990
1990 establishments in the Philippines
Distance education institutions based in the Philippines